Giuseppe Colucci (born 24 August 1980) is an Italian footballer who played as a central midfielder for several Serie A clubs.

Club career

Early career
Colucci started his professional career with Foggia, where he made 39 league appearances, accompanied by a single goal in 2 seasons with the club. After a successful spell with the Foggia, he was transferred to Serie A side Roma. He spent his time on loan at Bordeaux. He played twice for Bordeaux at 1999–2000 UEFA Champions League in March 2000, verse Valencia CF and AC Fiorentina, as second-half substitute.

Verona
In 2000, he was sold to Verona (in direct exchange deal with Alberto Maria Fontana), where he made 38 league appearances in 2 seasons. He then loaned to various Serie A clubs: Modena, Brescia, Reggina and Livorno, where he played more regularly at Modena and Reggina.

Catania
In August 2006, Colucci was signed by Catania on a co-ownership deal, and later extended the deal by signing a 3-year deal. Colucci made 23 and 19 starts respectively in the first two seasons. In his third season, he was not made part of the club's future by new coach Walter Zenga and failed to make an appearance that year.

Chievo and Cesena
On 2 February 2009, team-mate Gennaro Sardo and Colucci was transferred to Chievo in 6-month loan and 6-month contract respectively. Colucci was offered a new contract but failed to reach an agreement with Chievo.

In December 2009, he signed a contract with Cesena. He signed a new contract after Cesena remained at Serie A, extended the contract from 30 June 2012 to 30 June 2013.

Pescara
Following Cesena's relegation to Serie B, Colucci was presented on 13 July 2012 by newly promoted Serie A side Pescara as their first two acquisitions of the off-season alongside Elvis Abbruscato.

Reggina
On 22 January 2013, he was bought by Reggina. At the same time Giuseppe Rizzo was loaned to Pescara.

International career
Colucci has been capped five times for Italy U21 and played at 2002 UEFA European Under-21 Football Championship qualifying. He also played for Italy U18 team that lost to Portugal U18 team at UEFA European Under-18 Football Championship.

References

External links
Profile at Football.it 
National Team Archive  

1980 births
Living people
Sportspeople from Foggia
Italian footballers
Association football midfielders
Calcio Foggia 1920 players
A.S. Roma players
FC Girondins de Bordeaux players
Hellas Verona F.C. players
Modena F.C. players
Brescia Calcio players
Reggina 1914 players
U.S. Livorno 1915 players
Catania S.S.D. players
A.C. ChievoVerona players
A.C. Cesena players
Delfino Pescara 1936 players
Serie A players
Serie B players
Italy youth international footballers
Italy under-21 international footballers
Italian expatriate footballers
Italian expatriate sportspeople in France
Expatriate footballers in France
Footballers from Apulia